In June 2016, France played a two-test series against Argentina as part of the 2016 mid-year rugby union tests. They played Los Pumas across the two weeks that were allocated to the June International window (19 June and 25 June), and which were part of the fourth year of the global rugby calendar established by the International Rugby Board, which runs through to 2019. This was the first French tour to Argentina since their drawn series in 2012.

The French domestic Top 14 tournament ended later than usual, as no games were scheduled during the pool phase of the 2015 Rugby World Cup. Therefore, the semi-finals and final of the 2015–16 season coincided with the June international window, clashing with the French games on the 19 and 25 June.

Fixtures

Squads
Note: Ages, caps and clubs are as per 19 June, the first test match of the tour.

France
On 6 June, Guy Novès named the first set of players for France's two-test series against Argentina. The squad did not include any of the six Top 14 play-offs teams, Castres, Clermont, Toulon, Toulouse, Racing or Montpellier (except François Trinh-Duc who was released by Montpellier for the tour) due to the play-offs taking place between 11 and 24 June.

On 13 June, Novès named a further 11 players on top of the initial 17, after Toulouse and Castres and were eliminated from the Top 14 quarter-finals.

On  19 June, Paul Jedrasiak was called up to the squad following Clermont Auvergne's elimination from the Top 14.

Coaching team:
 Head coach:  Guy Novès
 Forwards coach:  Yannick Bru
 Backs coach:  Jean-Frederic Dubois

Argentina
On 31 May, Argentina named a 28-man squad for the June internationals against Italy and France.

On 12 June, Ignacio Larrague was called up to the squad as an injury replacement for Matías Alemanno.

On 16 June, Ramiro Herrera and Tomás Lavanini were called up to the squad ahead of the two-test series against France.

Coaching team:
 Head coach:  Daniel Hourcade
 Defence coach:  Pablo Bouza
 Backs coach:  Germán Fernández
 Forwards coach:  Emiliano Bergamaschi

Matches

First Test

Second Test

Argentina warm-up match
On 11 June, Argentina played host to Italy in the lead up to the French series.

Statistics
Key
Con: Conversions
Pen: Penalties
DG: Drop goals
Pts: Points

France statistics

Test series statistics

See also
 2016 mid-year rugby union internationals
 History of rugby union matches between Argentina and France

References

2016
Argentina
2016 rugby union tours
2016
2016 in Argentine rugby union